Cybernoid II: The Revenge is a shoot 'em up released by Hewson Consultants in 1988 for the Amstrad CPC, Commodore 64 and ZX Spectrum home computers. It was subsequently also released for the Atari ST and Amiga. It is the sequel to Cybernoid.

Overview
The game is similar to its predecessor, but with improved graphics and minor differences in gameplay. The player must pilot their fighter through multiple levels destroying pirate spacecraft while collecting gems and powerups.

Reception
Sinclair User: "If you're expecting something completely new and original, forget it..."
Your Sinclair: "... a souped-up, all-new version of the bestest blaster we've seen on the beermat this year..."
Crash: "Not as stunning second time round, but still maintains the original's playability ... 88%"

External links

Cybernoid 2 at The Little Green Desktop
Cybernoid II at Lemon Amiga
Cybernoid II at Lemon 64
Cybernoid 2 at C64.com

References

1988 video games
Amiga games
Amstrad CPC games
Atari ST games
Commodore 64 games
Hewson Consultants games
Shoot 'em ups
Single-player video games
Video game sequels
Video games developed in the United Kingdom
ZX Spectrum games